This article lists those elements of the Siegfried Line that have survived or whose function is still clearly recognisable. The structures are listed roughly from north to south and grouped by the individual construction programmes involved in building the Siegfried Line.

Geldern position, Brüggen-Kleve Sector 
 Kleve Sector of the Siegfried Line
 Three bunkers of Regelbau Type 102V near Kranenburg-Nütterden
 Regelbau Type 102V near Kessel
 Goch Sector of the Siegfried Line
 Five bunkers of Regelbau Type 102V near Goch

Border Guard Programme 
 Bunker for an anti-tank gun emplacement near Aachen-Bildchen
 Garage for an anti-tank gun emplacement near Simmerath
 Bunker near Simmerath
 Garage for an anti-tank gun emplacement near Monschau-Konzen

Engineer Programme 
 Saarland
 Merzig-Wadern county
 Besseringen B-Werk
 Bridge-guarding bunker, Mettlach (Regelbau B1-1 combined with Regelbau B1-18)
 Bridge-guarding bunker, Besseringen (Double machine gun emplacement, machine gun emplacement, anti-tank gun emplacement)
 Regelbau 105B8 (modified) in Besseringen
 Regelbau 121B8 (modified) in Besseringen
 Regelbau D2 in Beckingen (2 units)
 Regelbau C1 in Merzig
 Regelbau C7 near Beckingen (well preserved ruins)
 Regelbau B1-1a in Mettlach (2 units)
 Regelbau B1-1 above the Saar river loop (2 units)
 Regelbau B1-1 in Besseringen
 Regelbau B1-1 near St. Gangolf
 Regelbau B1-1 in Merzig
 Regelbau B1-1 in Saarfels
 Regelbau B1-1 in the Haardt
 Regelbau B1-2a above the Saar river loop
 Regelbau B1-2a near St. Gangolf
 Regelbau B1-5a in Mettlach
 Regelbau B1-5a in Merzig (4 units)
 Regelbau B1-5a in Besseringen (3 units)
 Regelbau B1-5a near Fremersdorf station
 Regelbau B1-7a in Mettlach (museum bunker)
 Regelbau B1-7a in Besseringen (3 units)
 Regelbau B1-20 (altered) in Besseringen
 Regelbau B1-23 in Mettlach (2 units)
 Regelbau B1-23 in Besseringen (2 units)
 Regelbau B1-25 in Besseringen
 Anti-tank gun emplacement near St. Gangolf
 Three-storey, specially designed bunker near Mettlach

Limes Programme 
 North Rhine-Westphalia
 Tank ditch (remains) in the forest opposite the Tüschenbroich Mill, Wegberg
 Bunker ruins near Dahlheim-Rödgen
 Bunker ruins at the  Burgberg, Wassenberg Castle
 Defended concrete garage/barn in Wassenberg, Rosenthal
 Three water-filled tank ditches in the Wurm valley near Geilenkirchen
 Tank obstacle south of Geilenkirchen consisting of concrete and U-profiles from Czech war booty material
 Observation post near Herzogenrath-Bank
 Diverse visible remains of four rows of  dragon's teeth near Aachen-Eilendorf and Münsterbusch
 One bunker to a special design within Burgau Castle near Düren-Niederau
 Bunker of Regelbau Type 10a (Bunker 371) on the Burgberg near Hürtgenwald-Bergstein
 Bunker of Regelbau Type 31 (Bunker 370) below the Burgberg near Hürtgenwald-Bergstein
 First aid post bunker of Regelbau Type 32 near Simonskall. The house built on the top of the bunkers was not used to camouflage the bunker as is often suggested, but was first built in the  1950s.
 Group of bunkers in the Buhlert forest area
 Two multiple fortified positions Regelbau Type 10 (Bunker 131 and 132)
 Double fortified position Regelbau Type 11 (Bunker 139/140)
 MG bunker Regelbau Type 23 (Bunker 135)
 One bunker for water supplies
 Fortified position of Regelbau Type 10 with a house built on top after the war Near Simmerath-Hechelscheidt
 Bunker for water supplies near Dahlem-Baasem
 Double fortified position of Regelbau Type 11 near Baasem
 Machine gun emplacement of Regelbau Type 1 B1/1 near Berk (Dahlem)
 Bunker  under the Dahlem-Kronenburg training establishment
 Machine gun emplacement, modified Regelbau Type 23 by the Trans-Venn Railway
 Two multiple fortified positions of Regelbau Type 10a near Dahlem-Kronenburg
 Bunker southeast of Osburg in the vicinity of the B 52 federal highway by the Grünbrücherschneise
 Saarland
 Merzig-Wadern county
 Regelbau 2 in Beckingen
 Regelbau 10 in Saarhölzbach (2 units)
 Regelbau 10 in Mettlach (with battle compartment on top)
 Regelbau 10 in Besseringen (3 units)
 Regelbau 10 near St. Gangolf
 Regelbau 10 in Merzig (5 units)
 Regelbau 10 (with battle compartment on top) in Merzig (2 units)
 Regelbau 10 (hillside design) in Merzig 
 Regelbau 10 in Harlingen
 Regelbau 10 in Bietzen (3 units)
 Regelbau 10 in Saarfels
 Regelbau 10 in Haustadt (museum bunker)
 Regelbau 10a in Mettlach (3 units)
 Regelbau 10a (with battle compartment on top) in Besseringen
 Regelbau 10a in Merzig (8 units)
 Regelbau 10a (hillside design) in Merzig (2 units)
 Regelbau 10a in Bietzen (3 units, 1 museum bunker)
 Regelbau 10a in Beckingen (6 units)
 Regelbau 10b1 in Mettlach
 Regelbau 10b1 in Merzig
 Regelbau 11 in Saarhölzbach
 Regelbau 11 in Besseringen 
 Regelbau 11 in Merzig (3 units)
 Regelbau 11 in Brotdorf (2 units)
 Regelbau 19 in Beckingen
 Regelbau 23 in Mettlach 
 Regelbau 23 in Merzig (3 units)
 Regelbau 31 in Brotdorf
 Regelbau 522B01 near Besseringen (variant of the Regelbau Type B1-25 to the “B-old” standard)
 Regelbau 1 (with open embrasure) museum bunker “Anton” near Besseringen 
 Baden-Württemberg
 Extensive bunkers and fortifications at the  Isteiner Klotz

Aachen-Saar Programme 
 Saarland
 Merzig-Wadern county
 Regelbau 101v in Rimlingen
 Regelbau 105b in Beckingen (5 units, 1 museum bunker)
 Regelbau 105d in Beckingen (2 units)
 Regelbau 106b in Beckingen
 Regelbau 108b in Beckingen (2 units)
 Regelbau 110 (with entranceway and Hohlgang) in Merzig (5 units, 1 museum bunker)
 Regelbau 114a in Beckingen (museum bunker)
 Regelbau 115b in Merzig
 Regelbau 120d (hillside and cave passage) near Harlingen (ruins)
 Special bunker with Type 20P7 six-port turret and group to “A” standard (two-storey) near Fremersdorf station

Wartime Regelbau 
 Saarland
 Merzig-Wadern county
 Regelbau 51a near Oberleuken (at least 2 units)
 Regelbau 501 in Sinz (2 units)
 Regelbau 502 near Oberleuken
 Regelbau 506 in Besseringen
 Regelbau 509c in Besseringen (2 units)
 Regelbau 509c (Vorderhang) in Merzig
 Regelbau 395 (“Heinrich”) in Beckingen (2 units)

Special elements 
 Various covered positions and MG emplacements reinforced at the  Orscholz Switch
 Diverse visible remains of five rows of dragon's teeth west of Aachen
 Armoured walls at the  Aachener Schneeberg and at the Aachen-Visé railway line
 Observation post near Aachen-Schleckheim
 Five rows of dragon's teeth near Aachen-Köpfchen
 Bunker in the Iterbach valley near Walheim
 Bunker in the Aachen Forest near Entenpfuhl - Regelbau SK6/a
 Regimen valley battle position near Aachen-Brand - Regelbau 117
 Five rows of dragon's teeth in the area of the Hotel Relais Königsberg
 Bridge design of the five rows of dragon's teeth at the dam of the Dreilägerbach
 Bunker for water supplies near Lammersdorf hunting lodge
 Diverse visible remains of five rows of dragon's teeth between Lammersdorf and Monschau
 Remains of a movable barrier near Lammersdorf
 Two armoured concrete shields near Hellenthal-Wahlerscheid
 Bunker for water supply near Hellenthal-Wahlerscheid
 Parallel running four and five rows of dragon's teeth between Hellenthal-Hollerath and Ormont

Rhineland-Palatinate 
 Westwallmuseen Wiltingen: MG Schartenstand and artillery OP
 verschiedene Höckerlinien between Brandscheid and Eschfeld
 intact Gruppenunterstand near Roth/Our
 Katzenkopf B-Werk near Irrel (Siegfried Line Museum)
 Gerstfeldhöhe A-Werk in Niedersimten  in the borough of Pirmasens (Siegfried Line Museum)
 Siegfried Line Museum, Bad Bergzabern

Saarland 

 Regelbau 114a in Beckingen
 Regelbau in Haustadt
 Siegfried Line bunker in Pachten
 Siegfried Line bunker Rentrisch 
 Halberg position with Bunker WH 316 
 Five rows of dragon's teeth near der B 41 between St. Wendel and Bliesen sowie Teile davon in Hofeld-Mauschbach and Baltersweiler
 Five rows of dragon's teeth near the Harschberger Hof on the B 269 federal road between St. Wendel and Winterbach
 Bunker near Hofeld-Mauschbach of unknown type (not blown up)

Baden 
 Bunker of Regelbau Type 10 in Rastatt 
 Bunker of Regelbau Type 32 in Dettenheim-Rußheim (managed by the Dettenheim Bunker Museum Society)

Air Defence Zone West 
 Bunker near Vettweis-Ginnick
 Bunker Type K in Isweiler near Frauwüllesheim
 Bunker near Nideggen-Schmidt
 Position near Kirspenich
 Position near Dahlem
 Water bunker near Kommern
 Armoured bunker near Bouderath
 Heavy anti-aircraft position in the Vollausbau near Zingsheim

See also 
Siegfried Line

References and external links

Literature 
 Dieter Bettinger, Martin Büren: Der Westwall. Die Geschichte der deutschen Westbefestigung im Dritten Reich. Vol. 1. Der Bau des Westwalls 1936–1945, Vol. 2. Die technische Ausführung des Westwalls. Biblio, Osnabrück, 1990, .
 Jörg Fuhrmeister: Der Westwall: Geschichte and Gegenwart. Motorbuch, Stuttgart, 2004, .
 Dieter Robert Bettinger, Hans-Josef Hansen, Daniel Lois: Der Westwall von Kleve bis Basel. Auf den Spuren deutscher Geschichte.  2. Auflage. Nebel Verlag, Eggolsheim, 2008, .
 Manfred Groß: Der Westwall zwischen Niederrhein und Schnee-Eifel. Rhineland-Verlag, Cologne, 1989, .
 Doris Seck: Saarländische Kriegsjahre. Vol. 2: Unternehmen Westwall. Buchverlag Saarbrücker Zeitung, Saarbrücken, 1985, .

!
Siegfried Line